Blizhnyaya Polubyanka is a rural locality (a selo) in Petrenkovskoye Rural Settlement, Ostrogozhsky District, Voronezh Oblast, Russia. The population was 385 as of 2010. There are 4 streets.

Geography 
Blizhnyaya Polubyanka is located 17 km southeast of Ostrogozhsk (the district's administrative centre) by road. Yarki is the nearest rural locality.

References 

Rural localities in Ostrogozhsky District